The Columbia City Historic District is a nationally recognized historic district located in the Columbia City neighborhood in the Rainier Valley area of Seattle, Washington. It is roughly bounded by South Hudson Street, South Alaska Street, 35th Avenue and Rainier Avenue. Its historic uses include specialty stores, multiple dwellings, single dwellings, meeting halls, schools, religious structures, and parks. Its architecture includes Mission Revival, Spanish Revival, Colonial Revival and other styles. On September 8, 1980, it was added to the National Register of Historic Places.

Contributing properties
The district contains 33 contributing resources, the list contains a mix of residential, commercial, and institutional buildings, and a park. Includes:
Fifth Church of Christ, Scientist building, which is now the Rainier Valley Cultural Center.

References

External links

 Columbia City Historical Walking Tour (covers the historic district plus some adjacent properties)

Historic districts on the National Register of Historic Places in Washington (state)
National Register of Historic Places in Seattle